One Piece is an upcoming streaming television series developed by Matt Owens and Steven Maeda for Netflix. The series is a live action adaptation of the ongoing 1997 Japanese manga series of the same name by Eiichiro Oda. It is produced by Tomorrow Studios and Shueisha (who also publish the manga). The series features an ensemble cast including Iñaki Godoy, Mackenyu, Emily Rudd, Jacob Romero Gibson, and Taz Skylar. The series is scheduled to premiere in 2023.

Premise 
The series follows the adventures of the fugitive Straw Hat Pirates, as they explore the dangerous oceans, lands and beyond in search of the "One Piece", a fabled treasure that will make their captain The King of the Pirates. But, the Navy is on their ship's tail and they are not the only crew searching for the One Piece. Armed with skills and unbreakable friendship, the Straw Hats are ready for the journey and even more ready to fight for their dreams together.

Cast and characters

Main 
 Iñaki Godoy as Monkey D. Luffy: An aloof, yet enthusiastic prospective pirate both cursed and gifted with powerful abilities from accidentally eating a mysterious fruit. His goal is to travel out of the East Blue with a crew of his own, find the mythical "One Piece" and become the King of the Pirates. Colton Osorio portrays a young Luffy.
 Mackenyu as Roronoa Zoro: An accomplished master swordsman and bounty hunter, who uses the art of "Santoryu" aka "Three Swords Style". He aims to become the world's greatest swordsman.
 Emily Rudd as Nami: An enigmatic thief who hides her past behind an aggressive indifference in search of a map to the Grand Line, where the One Piece is strongly rumored to be located. She's taken it upon herself to navigate and map out the entire world.
 Jacob Romero Gibson as Usopp: Boisterous, yet noble to a fault for his friends and allies; Usopp specializes in marksmanship, cunning and invention. He intends to be a brave, famous warrior of the sea recognized by his infamous pirate father, Yasopp.
 Taz Skylar as Sanji: An abrasive, woman-loving, yet charming master chef who is a practitioner of martial arts primarily using his legs taught to him by his mentor and head chef, Zeff. His purpose is to find the All Blue, a mythical sea that connects the four seas together and provide quality meals to all.

Recurring 
 Peter Gadiot as Shanks: The captain of the Red-Haired Pirates who was Luffy's childhood hero and inspiration to start his own crew.
 Morgan Davies as Koby: A cabin boy of the Alvida Pirates who dreams of joining the Navy.
 Ilia Isorelýs Paulino as Alvida: The ruthless leader of the Alvida Pirates who fights with a large spiked iron club.
 Aidan Scott as Helmeppo: The son of Captain Morgan and who uses his father's status as a Marine Captain to bully others into doing his bidding.
 Langley Kirkwood as Captain Morgan: A self-obsessed Navy Captain who imprisoned Zoro, and the father of Helmeppo.
 Jeff Ward as Buggy: The clown-themed captain of the Buggy Pirates whose Devil Fruit he ate gives him the ability to split his own body into pieces and control them as he sees fit.
 Celeste Loots as Kaya: An orphaned heiress and Usopp's close friend.
 Alexander Maniatis as Klahadore: One of Kaya's butlers.
 Bianca Oosthuizen as Sham: An officer of the Black Cat Pirates and Buchi’s partner.
 Chanté Grainger as Banchina: Usopp's mother and Yasopp’s wife.
 Craig Fairbrass as Chef Zeff: Former pirate and currently the head chef and owner of Baratie, a floating restaurant, and Sanji's father figure.
 Steven Ward as Dracule Mihawk: A pirate regarded as the world's greatest swordsman.
 McKinley Belcher III as Arlong: A strong, ruthless fishman who is the leader of the Arlong Pirates and ruler of Arlong Park.
 Chioma Umeala as Nojiko: Nami's older sister by adoption.
 Vincent Regan as Garp: A prolific Vice Admiral in the Navy.
 Grant Ross as Genzo: Sheriff of the Coco Village, and Nami's father figure.
 Tamer Burjaq as Higuma: A sinister mountain bandit who tried to kill Luffy in his youth.
 Stevel Marc as Yasopp: An officer of the Red Hair Pirates and Usopp's father.
 Jandre le Roux as Kuroobi: An officer of the Arlong Pirates.

Episodes 

The first season will consist of ten episodes, with Marc Jobst directing the first two.

Production

Development 
In July, 2017, Weekly Shōnen Jump editor-in-chief Hiroyuki Nakano announced that Tomorrow Studios (a partnership between Marty Adelstein and ITV Studios) and Shueisha would commence production of an American live-action television adaptation of Eiichiro Oda's One Piece manga series as part of the series' 20th anniversary celebrations. Oda will serve as executive producer for the series alongside Tomorrow Studios CEO Adelstein and Becky Clements. The series will reportedly begin with the East Blue saga. Adelstein also said the production cost could set new records.

In January 2020, Oda revealed that Netflix ordered a first season consisting of ten episodes. On May 2020, producer Marty Adelstein revealed during an interview with Syfy Wire, that the series was originally set to begin filming in Cape Town at Cape Town Film Studios sometime around August, but has since been delayed to around September due to the COVID-19 pandemic. He also revealed that, during the same interview, all ten scripts had been written for the series and they were set to begin casting sometime in June. However, executive producer and writer Matt Owens stated in September 2020 that casting had not yet commenced.

In March 2021, production started up again with showrunner Steven Maeda revealing that the series codename is Project Roger. In September 2021, the series revealed its first look at the logo for the series. That same month, it was reported that Marc Jobst will direct the pilot episode of the series. In February 2022, it was announced that Arisu Kashiwagi will be the creative director and designer for the show's brand identity, where she will be creating and designing logo and title sequence etc. In March 2022, alongside the release of additional casting announcements, it was said that head writer and executive producer Matt Owens would serve as co-showrunner alongside Maeda. In June 2022, Emma Sullivan was revealed to have directed episodes of the series.

Casting 
In November 2021, the main cast portraying the Straw Hat Pirates was revealed via a series of wanted posters: Iñaki Godoy as Monkey D. Luffy, Mackenyu as Roronoa Zoro, Emily Rudd as Nami, Jacob Romero Gibson as Usopp, and Taz Skylar as Sanji.

In March 2022, Netflix added Morgan Davies as Koby, Ilia Isorelýs Paulino as Alvida, Aidan Scott as Helmeppo, Jeff Ward as Buggy, McKinley Belcher III as Arlong, Vincent Regan as Garp and Peter Gadiot as Shanks to the cast in recurring roles.

In June 2022 saw the addition of Langley Kirkwood as Captain Morgan, Celeste Loots as Kaya, Alexander Maniatis as Klahadore, Craig Fairbrass as Zeff, Steven Ward as Dracule Mihawk, and Chioma Umeala as Nojiko. In August 2022, Bianca Oosthuizen, Chanté Grainger, and Grant Ross joined the cast of the series, playing Sham, Banchina, and Genzo respectively.

In February 2023, it was revealed that Stevel Marc had been cast as Yasopp. In March 2023, it was revealed that Jandre le Roux had been cast as Kuroobi.

Filming 
Maeda officially announced that principal photography had begun on January 31, and finished filming on August 22, 2022. In May 2022, director Marc Jobst updated that he had finished filming the first two episodes of the show. Part of the filming took place in Cape Town, South Africa at Cape Town Film Studios. Nicole Hirsch Whitaker, the show's cinematographer said that she had her crew six weeks before the production began.

See also 
 List of One Piece media

References

External links 
 
 

2020s American drama television series

English-language Netflix original programming
One Piece mass media
Television shows based on manga
Television shows filmed in South Africa
Upcoming Netflix original programming
Upcoming television series
Television series about pirates
Television series by ITV Studios
Television series set in fictional countries
Television series set on fictional islands